Versova may refer to:

 Versova, Ghodbunder
 Versova, Greece, a town in Greece
 Versova, Mumbai, a neighbourhood in Mumbai
 Versova (Vidhan Sabha constituency)
 Versova metro station in Mumbai
 Madh Fort, also known as Versova Fort, in northern Mumbai.